Weathershow is an EP released by former Belle & Sebastian member Isobel Campbell under the name of The Gentle Waves. The album was released in March 1999.

Track listing
"Weathershow"
"Evensong (french version)"

External links
 Official website Info on the album

1999 EPs
Isobel Campbell albums
Jeepster Records EPs